The S12 is a regional railway line of the S-Bahn Zürich on the Zürcher Verkehrsverbund (ZVV), Zürich transportation network. The S12 is one of the network's lines connecting the cantons of Zürich, Aargau, Schaffhausen, Thurgau and St. Gallen.

Route 
 

Line S12 commences at Brugg station, in the canton of Aargau, and follows the Zürich–Baden railway as far as Zürich Hardbrücke station and the approaches to Zürich Hauptbahnhof station. Passing through the lower level platforms at this station, the line then passes through the Hirschengraben and Zürichberg tunnels, and Stettbach station, before joining the Zürich to Winterthur line. The S12 follows this line as far as Winterthur Hauptbahnhof station, running non-stop between Stettbach and Winterthur, from where it continues to either Schaffhausen, or Wil SG.

Trains on the S12 usually run every 30 minutes, with a journey time of around 96 to 97 minutes. The alternation of trains to Schaffhausen and Wil SG Seen provides an hourly service to each terminus.

Stations
The following stations are served by the S12.

Stations served by all S12 trains 
 Brugg AG
 Turgi
 Baden
 Wettingen
 Neuenhof
 Killwangen-Spreitenbach
 Dietikon
 Glanzenberg
 Schlieren
 Zürich Altstetten
 Zürich Hardbrücke
 Zürich Hauptbahnhof
 Zürich Stadelhofen
 Stettbach
 Winterthur Hauptbahnhof

Stations served by trains on the S12 Schaffhausen branch 
 Winterthur Hauptbahnhof
 Hettlingen
 Henggart
 Andelfingen
 Marthalen
 Dachsen
 Schloss Laufen am Rheinfall
 Neuhausen
 Schaffhausen

Stations served by trains on the S12 Wil SG branch 
 Winterthur Hauptbahnhof
 Winterthur Grüze
 Winterthur Hegi
 Räterschen
 Schottikon
 Elgg
 Aadorf
 Guntershausen
 Eschlikon
 Sirnach
 Wil SG

Rolling stock 
 S12 services are operated by RABe 511 units, except for weekday services to Schaffhausen which are run by Re 450 class locomotives pushing or pulling double-deck passenger carriages.

History
Before the timetable change in late 2018, at Winterthur, alternate trains took different routes, running either over the Tösstalbahn as far as Winterthur Seen station, or over the Winterthur to Etzwilen line as far as Seuzach station.

Trains on the old S12 route usually ran every 30 minutes, with a journey time of around 70 to 75 minutes. The alternation of trains to Seuzach and Winterthur Seen provided an hourly service to each terminus.

See also 

 Rail transport in Switzerland
 Trams in Zürich

References

External links 

 ZVV official website: Routes & zones

Zürich S-Bahn lines
Transport in Aargau
Transport in the canton of Zürich